"III Wishes" is a song by English rock band Terrorvision, which was released in 1999 as the third and final single from their fourth studio album Shaving Peaches. The song was written by Terrorvision and produced by John Cornfield. "III Wishes" reached No. 42 in the UK Singles Chart and remained in the Top 100 for two weeks.

Background
"III Wishes" failed to live up to the expectations of EMI after the band's success with the UK No. 2 hit "Tequila" earlier in the year. When "III Wishes" stalled at No. 42 in the UK Singles Chart, EMI dropped the band.

According to vocalist Tony Wright, distribution and stock issues hindered the song's success. He told Metal Express Radio in 2013, "When people say 'Tequila' was a bit of luck, it wasn't. It was 15 years of hard graft and given to a numpty at the label who couldn't even get the follow up single into the shops and we lost all that momentum because of that."

A music video was filmed to promote the single. The band also performed the song on The Pepsi Chart Show, which was broadcast on Channel 5 on 13 May 1999.

Critical reception
On its release as a single, Ian Hyland of the Sunday Mirror picked "III Wishes" as one of the "singles of the week" and gave it an 8 out of 10 rating. He wrote, "Not as catchy as 'Tequila' but just as easy to remember after you've had a few. Grin and swear it." The Evening Standard wrote, "A lovely crunchy bassline, meaty, spirited, roaring, and a song which seems to be made up entirely of its chorus". They added, "Nothing like as annoyingly naff as 'Tequila', their last hit."

Track listing
Cassette single
"III Wishes" (Radio Edit) – 3:31
"Tequila" (Mint Royale Shot) – 4:09
"Moonage Daydream" – 4:11

CD single (UK #1)
"III Wishes" (Radio Edit) – 3:31
"Tequila" (Mint Royale Shot) – 4:09
"If That's What It Takes" – 2:41

CD single (UK #2)
"III Wishes" (Radio Edit) – 3:31
"III Wishes" (Scuba Z Remix) – 3:37
"100 Things" – 2:47

CD single (UK promo #1)
"III Wishes" (Radio Edit) – 3:31

CD single (UK promo #2)
"III Wishes" (Radio Edit) – 3:31
"III Wishes" (Scuba Z Remix) – 3:37
"III Wishes" (Arthur Baker Remix) – 3:37

Personnel
Credits are adapted from the UK CD1 and CD2 liner notes and the Shaving Peaches booklet.

Terrorvision
 Tony Wright – lead vocals, backing vocals
 Mark Yates – electric guitar, acoustic guitar
 Leigh Marklew – bass
 Ian "Shutty" Shuttleworth – drums, percussion

Production
 John Cornfield – producer and mixing on "III Wishes"
 Terrorvision – producers and mixing on "Moonage Daydream" and "100 Things", producers on "If That's What It Takes"
 Pat Grogan – producer and mixing on "Moonage Daydream" and "100 Things"
 Edwyn Collins – producer on "Tequila"
 Scuba Z, Arthur Baker – remixes of "III Wishes"

Other
 AP;D – design
 Rob White – photography

Charts

References

1998 songs
1999 singles
Terrorvision songs
EMI Records singles